Pedro de Ayala (1503-September 19, 1569) was a Roman Catholic prelate who served as the third Bishop of Guadalajara (1561–1569).

Biography
Pedro de Ayala was born in Guadalajara, Spain and ordained a priest in the Order of Friars Minor. On December 18, 1561, he was appointed by the King of Spain and confirmed by Pope Pius IV as the third Bishop of Guadalajara. On November 8, 1562, he was consecrated bishop by Alonso de Montúfar, Archbishop of Mexico with Vasco de Quiroga, Bishop of Michoacán, and Fernando de Villagómez, Bishop of Tlaxcala (Puebla de los Angeles) serving as Co-Consecrators. He served as Bishop of Guadalajara until his death on September 19, 1569.

See also
Catholic Church in Mexico

References

External links and additional sources
 (for Chronology of Bishops)
 (for Chronology of Bishops)

1503 births
1569 deaths
Bishops appointed by Pope Pius IV
Franciscan bishops
People from Guadalajara, Spain
16th-century Roman Catholic bishops in Mexico